WGMZ (93.1 FM) is a radio station licensed to Glencoe, Alabama, United States. WGMZ serves the Gadsden, Alabama, and Anniston, Alabama, metropolitan areas.  The station is owned by San Antoniobased iHeartMedia and licensed to iHM Licenses, LLC. It broadcasts a classic hits music format.

History
The station was assigned the WGMZ call letters by the Federal Communications Commission on June 15, 1993. Prior to that, the call letters were used in the Flint, Michigan, market on several stations, notably on what is now WCRZ-FM from 1961 to 1984.

WGMZ dropped Top 40 for the Target Radio Satellite Networks adult alternative format "theLYTE".

In 2006, WGMZ (Z-93.1) hired morning popular talents Rick Sisk and Dennis Deason and shifted Wild Bill Seckbach from AM to PM drive.  WGMZ's primary coverage area includes Etowah and Calhoun counties (Gadsden/Anniston, AL)

References

External links

GMZ
Classic hits radio stations in the United States
Radio stations established in 1994
Etowah County, Alabama
IHeartMedia radio stations
1994 establishments in Alabama